Joseff John Morrell (born 3 January 1997) is a Welsh professional footballer who plays as a central-midfielder for Portsmouth and the Wales national team.

Club career
Morrell began his career with Bristol City whilst attending The Castle School in Thornbury, and signed a professional contract with the club in December 2012 after turning down an offer from Liverpool. He made his debut on 8 October 2013 in a 2–1 Football League Trophy defeat against Wycombe Wanderers.

In August 2016 it was announced that Morrell would join National League club Sutton United, initially on a one-month loan. He made his first appearance for the U's as a substitute coming on at 61' in a 3–1 victory over Lincoln City at Sincil Bank on 13 August 2016, Sutton's first win in English football's fifth tier in 16 years. One reporter described Morrell as having "had a great competitive debut overall". He made two further substitute appearances in home victories against Torquay United and Macclesfield Town before returning to his parent club in early September 2016.

On 24 February 2017, Morrell joined Margate on loan for a month. He made his debut as a 58th minute substitute during a 2–0 home loss to Whitehawk.

Cheltenham Town (loan) 

On 30 August 2017, Morrell signed for Cheltenham Town on loan until January 2018. His first goal for the club came in a 3–0 win against Mansfield Town and scored three times in total for the club.

Lincoln City (loan) 
On 27 June 2019, Morrell signed for Lincoln City on a season-long loan until May 2020. He scored his first goal in a dominant 5–1 win against Bolton Wanderers on 14 January 2020, however it was later given as an own-goal for Josh Emmanuel.

On 7 March 2020, Morrell played his final game for the Imps against Burton Albion, due to the season being cancelled early because of COVID-19.

In June 2020, Morrell was named Lincoln City's Player of the Season.

Return to Bristol City 
In November 2019 he signed a new contract with Bristol City.

Luton Town 
On 15 October 2020 Morrell joined Luton Town for an undisclosed fee.

Portsmouth 

On 9 August 2021, Morrell joined EFL League One Portsmouth for an undisclosed fee on a 3-year contract with a 12-month extension clause. On the 21st October 2023, Morell scored his first goal for Portsmouth against Exeter City after 49 games and 13 league appearances in the 2022/23 season

International career
Morrell qualifies to play for Wales through his Welsh mother Sian.

In October 2017, Morrell made his Wales U21 debut in a 3–1 victory against Liechtenstein.

In August 2019, Morrell was named in the Wales squad ahead of their Euro 2020 qualifier against Azerbaijan. He made his senior international debut for Wales against Belarus on 9 September 2019.

In May 2021 he was selected for the Wales squad for the delayed UEFA Euro 2020 tournament. In November 2022 he was named in the Wales squad for the 2022 FIFA World Cup in Qatar. Morrell made his World cup debut coming on as a late substitute against the United States in Wales' opening 2022 FIFA World Cup Group B game, Morrell also came on as a substitute in the group stage game against England.

Career statistics

Club

International
.

References

External links

1997 births
Living people
Sportspeople from Ipswich
Welsh footballers
English footballers
English people of Welsh descent
Association football forwards
Bristol City F.C. players
Sutton United F.C. players
Margate F.C. players
Cheltenham Town F.C. players
Lincoln City F.C. players
Luton Town F.C. players
Portsmouth F.C. players
National League (English football) players
English Football League players
Wales youth international footballers
Wales under-21 international footballers
Wales international footballers
UEFA Euro 2020 players
2022 FIFA World Cup players